Zhengzhou University Sci-Tech Park is a station of Phase II of Line 1, Zhengzhou Metro. The station started construction in February 2014 and was put into service at January 2017 with the beginning of trial operation of Phase II. This station lies beneath the crossing of Changchun Road (长椿路) and Cuizhu Street (翠竹街), outside the east gate of Zhengzhou University (new campus).

Station layout  
The station has 2 floors underground. The B1 floor is for the station concourse and the B2 floor is for the platforms and tracks. The station has one island platform and two tracks for Line 1.

Exits
There are 4 exits serving this station - A and D lies on the south and the north side of Cuizhu Street while B and C lies with the same order of the east gate of Zhengzhou University.

Surrounding sites 
 Zhengzhou University (new campus)
 Zhengzhou University Sci-tech Park
 Experimental Primary School of Zhengzhou University
 Zhengzhou Machinery Research Institute

References 

Zhengzhou University
Stations of Zhengzhou Metro
Line 1, Zhengzhou Metro
Railway stations in China opened in 2017
Railway stations in China at university and college campuses